John Lythgoe (3 April 1892–1969) was an English footballer who played in the Football League for Bury, Newport County, Norwich City and Nottingham Forest.

References

1892 births
1969 deaths
English footballers
Association football forwards
English Football League players
Bury F.C. players
Nottingham Forest F.C. players
Newport County A.F.C. players
Norwich City F.C. players
Ebbw Vale F.C. players
Eccles United F.C. players
Chorley F.C. players
Crewe Alexandra F.C. players
Margate F.C. players
Horwich F.C. players